Dragan Kićanović (born 17 August 1953) is a Serbian and Yugoslav retired professional basketball player.

A 1.92m (6 ft 3 in) tall shooting guard, Kićanović played in the 1970s and 1980s, and is considered to be one of the best European players and scorers of all time, having won both the Mr. Europa and the Euroscar European Player of the Year awards in 1981 and 1982. He was named one of FIBA's 50 Greatest Players in 1991. On 20 August 2010, Kićanović became a FIBA Hall of Fame player, in recognition of his play in international competitions. He was named the Best athlete of Yugoslavia in 1982, and he was also named the Best Basketball Player of Yugoslavia in the 20th century.

Since September 2013, he's been performing the role of consul general at the Serbian consulate in Trieste.

Club career
During the 1970s, Kićanović played club basketball alongside Dražen Dalipagić, and together they created an accomplished duo as members of Partizan Belgrade. In international club competition, Kićanović won two consecutive European-wide 3rd-tier level FIBA Korać Cup championships, with Partizan Belgrade  (1977–78 and 1978–79). He scored 33 points in the 1977–78 Finals (behind only Dalipagić's 48 points), and 41 points in the 1978–79 Finals.

Furthermore, he also won a European-wide 2nd-tier level FIBA European Cup Winners' Cup (FIBA Saporta Cup) title with Scavolini Pesaro, in the 1982–83 season. In which, he again dominated in the competition's final, as he scored 31 points and handed out eight assists. With Partizan Belgrade, Kićanović also won three Yugoslavian First Federal League championships (1976, 1979, and 1981), and a Yugoslavian Cup title in 1979. He was a three-time member of the FIBA European Selection Team (1976, 1978, and 1981).

National team career
Kićanović played with the senior Yugoslavian national basketball team from 1973 to 1983, and he competed at all the major international FIBA competitions: the FIBA EuroBasket, the FIBA World Cup and the Summer Olympic Games. He won the FIBA EuroBasket three times (1973, 1975, and 1977). He was twice named to the EuroBasket All-Tournament Team (1979 and 1981).

At the Summer Olympic Games, Kićanović won the silver medal at the 1976 Summer Olympic Games and the gold medal at the 1980 Summer Olympic Games. At the FIBA World Cup, he won the silver medal at the 1974 FIBA World Championship, and he was selected as the Most Valuable Player of the tournament. He also won the gold medal at the 1978 FIBA World Championship, and the bronze medal at the 1982 FIBA World Championship. He was the top scorer in total points scored, of the 1982 World Championship, as he scored a total of 190 points. He was also named to the All-Tournament Teams of both the 1978 and 1982 tournaments. He is one of the leading scorers of all-time, in the history of the FIBA World Cup, having scored a total of 491 points at the tournament.

Administrative career

KK Partizan
Shortly after retiring from playing basketball, Kićanović was named vice-president at Partizan Belgrade, under the club presidency of Tomislav Jeremić. With the division of tasks, Jeremić was mostly involved on the business end, while Kićanović ran the squad, making decisions on everything from player personnel to coaching acquisitions. He immediately brought in Zoran Slavnić, his former teammate from the Yugoslav national team, where the two were part of the famous one–two back-court guard duo, as the club's new head coach.

See also
Yugoslav First Federal Basketball League career stats leaders

References

External links 
 FIBA.com Hall of Fame Profile
 
 FIBA Europe Profile
 Italian League Profile 
 
 
 
 
 Feljton Kića 1-7
 Mr. Europa Winners
 Euroscar Winners
 Dragan Kicanovic, the Cacak genius.

1953 births
Living people
Basketball players from Čačak
Basketball players at the 1976 Summer Olympics
Basketball players at the 1980 Summer Olympics
Competitors at the 1971 Mediterranean Games
Competitors at the 1975 Mediterranean Games
European champions for Yugoslavia
Euroscar award winners
FIBA EuroBasket-winning players
FIBA Hall of Fame inductees
KK Borac Čačak players
KK Partizan players
Lega Basket Serie A players
Medalists at the 1976 Summer Olympics
Medalists at the 1980 Summer Olympics
Mediterranean Games gold medalists for Yugoslavia
Olympic basketball players of Yugoslavia
Olympic gold medalists for Yugoslavia
Olympic medalists in basketball
Olympic silver medalists for Yugoslavia
Paris Racing Basket players
Serbian men's basketball players
Serbian basketball executives and administrators
Serbian expatriate basketball people in Italy
Serbian expatriate basketball people in France
Serbian sports executives and administrators
Socialist Party of Serbia politicians
Shooting guards
Victoria Libertas Pallacanestro players
Yugoslav men's basketball players
1974 FIBA World Championship players
1978 FIBA World Championship players
1982 FIBA World Championship players
FIBA World Championship-winning players
Mediterranean Games medalists in basketball